Gale Centre is a four rink ice complex containing a 2,170 seat arena located in Niagara Falls, Ontario. It was built on the site of the demolished Cyanamid Niagara plant.

References

Buildings and structures in Niagara Falls, Ontario
Sports venues in Ontario